Women's Legal Education and Action Fund, referred to by the acronym LEAF, is "the only national organization in Canada that exists to ensure the equality rights of women and girls under the law.". Established on April 19, 1985, LEAF was formed in response to the enactment of Section 15 of the Canadian Charter of Rights and Freedoms to ensure that there was fair and unbiased interpretation of women's Charter rights by the courts. LEAF performs legal research and intervenes in appellate and Supreme Court of Canada cases on women's issues . LEAF has been an intervener in many significant decisions of the Supreme Court of Canada, particularly cases involving section 15 Charter challenges. In addition to its legal work, LEAF also organizes speaking engagements and projects that allow lawyers interested in women's rights to educate one another, to educate the public, and to create collective responses to legal issues related to women's equality. LEAF was created by Doris Anderson and other women.

Purpose
To ensure that the equality rights of women, girls, trans, and non-binary people in Canada, as guaranteed in the Canadian Charter of Rights and Freedoms, are upheld in courts, human rights commissions and government agencies; and to take actions to reveal how factors such as race, class, Aboriginal status, sexual orientation, ability, and religion compound discrimination against women.

Controversies
Some of the cases the Women's Legal Education and Action Fund have intervened in proved to be controversial.  These include the acquittal of Bassam Al Rawi, and the case of Nicole Patricia Ryan, also known as Nicole Doucet Ryan, who was arrested after attempting to hire an undercover Royal Canadian Mounted Police officer as a hit man to kill her husband.  The defense claimed she was under duress due to an abusive relationship in which the RCMP had ignored her requests for help.  Neither the RCMP nor the husband was called to testify against her accusations, however both refuted her claims.

LEAF's interventions may impact legal rules both directly and indirectly. Peter Manfredi concludes that the area where legal change made the most significant practical achievement was in the area of abortion rights. LEAF's defence of the elimination that only hospitals may perform abortions had far-reaching implications for women, with a significant increase in the number of legal abortions performed after 1988.  Manfredi footnotes that since LEAF's confusing interventions in the obscenity debate, LEAF experienced two consecutive losses and ponders that it may be too early to tell whether these losses signal a change in the relationship between LEAF and the Supreme Court. LEAF has often suffered other significant losses at the Supreme Court, but it has proved resilient in attracting funding and intervening status at the Supreme Court of Canada.

Mary Eberts controversially represented Beth Symes, another LEAF founder, in Symes v. Canada, [1993] 4 S.C.R. 695  in which LEAF, while not on the docket, made its presence known through the works cited by the high court. While LEAF never formally represented Symes, its de facto intervention was not successful; Symes's attempt to claim her child care deductions as business expenses was disallowed.

Notable interventions
 R. v. Ryan
 Little Sisters Book and Art Emporium v. Canada (Minister of Justice), [2000] 2 S.C.R. 1120
 British Columbia (PSERC) v. BCGSEU [1999] 3 S.C.R. 3
 M. v. H., [1999] 2 S.C.R. 3
 Eldridge v. British Columbia (Attorney General), [1997] 3 S.C.R. 624
 Weatherall v. Canada (Attorney General), [1993] 2 S.C.R. 872
 R. v. Butler, [1992] 1 S.C.R. 452
 Canadian Council of Churches v. Canada (Minister of Employment and Immigration), [1992] 1 S.C.R. 236
 Norberg v. Wynrib, [1992] 2 S.C.R. 224
 R. v. Sullivan, [1991] 1 S.C.R. 489
 Brooks v. Canada Safeway Ltd., [1989] 1 S.C.R. 1219
 Andrews v. Law Society of British Columbia, [1989] 1 S.C.R. 143
 R. v. J.A., 2011 SCC 28

References

External links
 LEAF website
 From NAACP to LEAF: American Legal Exports to Canada (article by Ian Brodie)

Anti-pornography feminism
Law of Canada
Feminist organizations in Canada
Women's organizations based in Canada
Legal history of Canada
Organizations established in 1985
1985 establishments in Canada
Legal advocacy organizations based in Canada
Legal organizations based in Ontario
Organizations based in Toronto